Garrabost is a village in the Point (An Rubha) peninsula isthmus on the east coast of the Isle of Lewis, in the Outer Hebrides, Scotland. The village is one of the largest in Point, comprising Upper and Lower Garrabost, and Claypark. Garrabost is within the civil parish of Stornoway. The church parish for Point is called Knock, and both Knock Church of Scotland and Knock Free Church of Scotland are located in Garrabost. Garrabost is situated on the A866, between Stornoway and Portnaguran.

References

External links

Canmore - Lewis, Garrabost, Mill site record
Canmore - Lewis, Garrabost Brickworks site record
Canmore - Lewis, Garrabost, Parish Church site record
Canmore - Lewis, Garrabost, Free Church site record
Canmore - Lewis, Garrabost, Cnoc An Oil site record
Canmore - Lewis, Garrabost, Dursainean Standing Stone site record
Canmore - Lewis, Garrabost, St Cowstan's Chapel site record
Canmore - Lewis, Garrabost, Cnoc Nan Dursainean site record

Villages in the Isle of Lewis